Phaeosaccion is a genus of algae with monostromatic tubular to saccate thalli, up to  long and to  wide. It is the sole genus in the family Phaeosaccionaceae. It is olive brown and resembles young plants of Scytosiphon. The sole species in the genus is Phaeosaccion collinsii, a species of marine algae. It was first identified in a publication by W.G. Farlow in the article Notes on New England algae published in Bulletin of the Torrey Botanical Club in 1882. It was named in honor of Frank Shipley Collins. Phaeosacchion collinsii is red listed in Iceland as a vulnerable species (VU).

References

Ochrophyta
Monotypic algae genera
Heterokont genera